Araucarites is an extinct genus of conifer, used to refer to female conifer cones that resemble those of the family Araucariaceae. Species assigned to the genus lived in the Permian to Eocene and have been found worldwide.

Species
A number of species have been described in Araucarites.
A. aquiensis
A. cutchensis
A. goepperti
A. ooliticum
A. pachacuteci
A. selseyensis

References 

Cenozoic plants
Mesozoic plants
Araucariaceae
Prehistoric gymnosperm genera